Charters Towers was an electoral district of the Legislative Assembly in the Australian state of Queensland. It has had three incarnations, most recently being created as part of a redistribution in 1991 and lasting until 2008.

The latest incarnation of Charters Towers was created in 1992, largely as a replacement for the abolished Flinders. The electorate covered a vast area of central Queensland, from Etheridge Shire in the north to Jericho Shire in the south. Besides its namesake town, Charters Towers, other major locations within the division included Georgetown, Hughenden, Richmond, Moranbah, Clermont, Tieri, Alpha, Aramac and Muttaburra.  It was located in what was now National heartland, and was held by that party and its successor, the Liberal National Party, for all but one term. The seat fell to Labor during its 2001 landslide, but reverted to its conservative ways in 2004.

In 2008, Charters Towers was abolished—with effect at the 2009 state election—as a result of a redistribution undertaken by the Electoral Commission of Queensland. Its former territory and voters were split between the districts of Burdekin, Gregory, Mount Isa and the new seat of Dalrymple. The seat's last member, Shane Knuth, transferred to Dalrymple.

An earlier district called Charters Towers based in the same region existed from 1888 to 1960—firstly as a dual member electorate, and from 1912 as a single member electorate. Its most notable representative was Anderson Dawson of the Labor Party, Premier of Queensland for six days in December 1899, and leader of the world's first parliamentary socialist government.

Members for Charters Towers

Election results

See also
 Electoral districts of Queensland
 Members of the Queensland Legislative Assembly by year
 :Category:Members of the Queensland Legislative Assembly by name

References

External links 
 District Profile - Charters Towers
 Anderson (Andrew) Dawson biography

Former electoral districts of Queensland
Charters Towers